Chilina elegans is an air-breathing freshwater snail species in the genus Chilina. It is found in Chile.

References

External links 
 WoRMS

Chilinidae
Gastropods described in 1865
Taxa named by Georg Ritter von Frauenfeld
Molluscs of Chile
Endemic fauna of Chile